Richard A. Cantwell (22 February 1898 – 22 May 1981) was an Irish hurler. Usually lining out as a goalkeeper, he was a member of the Kilkenny senior hurling team that won the 1926 Leinster Championship.

Honours

Mooncoin
Kilkenny Senior Hurling Championship (2): 1927, 1929

Kilkenny
Leinster Senior Hurling Championship (1): 1926

References

1898 births
1981 deaths
Hurling goalkeepers
Mooncoin hurlers
Kilkenny inter-county hurlers